Zaya Avdysh was a Soviet football player and Ukrainian football coach of Assyrian ethnic origin and the president of FC Polissya Zhytomyr in 1999–2004.

Zaya was a brother of another football player and later a football referee Valeriy Avdysh.

External links
 Zaya Avdysh at the footballfacts.ru

1945 births
2015 deaths
Footballers from Kyiv
Ukrainian people of Assyrian descent
Soviet footballers
Ukrainian footballers
FC Polissya Zhytomyr players
Vakhsh Qurghonteppa players
FC Sakhalin Yuzhno-Sakhalinsk players
FC Vostok players
FC Polissya Zhytomyr managers
FC Temp Shepetivka managers
Soviet football managers
Ukrainian football managers
Merited Coaches of Ukraine
Assyrian sportspeople
Association football defenders
Assyrian footballers
FC Dynamo Makhachkala players